Vasantrao Naik Marathwada Krishi Vidyapeeth (VNMKV), formerly Marathwada Krishi Vidyapeeth (MKV), is an agricultural university at Parbhani in the Indian state of Maharashtra.

History

The foundation of agricultural research in Parbhani was laid by the erstwhile Nizam of Hyderabad with the commencement of the Main Experimental Farm in 1918. Though during Nizam's rule agricultural education was available only at Hyderabad but crop research centers for sorghum, cotton, fruits existed in the region. After independence, the first college of Agriculture was established in Parbhani in 1956 by Hyderabad State government just before State reorganization. Lastly on 18 May 1972, university was established.

The objectives of the university are education in agriculture and allied sciences, research based on regional needs and facilitate technology transfer, etc. It is the only agricultural university in India where all the branches of Agricultural Sciences are taught. It is named after former Chief Minister of Maharashtra Vasantrao Naik.
 
It is funded and regulated by the ICAR, Government of India.

The academic year 2021 to 2022 was golden jubilee year of the university.

Academics
, the university has 12 constituent colleges and 43 affiliated colleges, with a total intake of 4175 students. constituent colleges have undergraduate, postgraduate and Ph.D. courses, while affiliated colleges have only undergraduate studied. The university also has 9 constituent agriculture schools and 53 affiliated ones, with a total intake of 3270 students.

Constituent colleges
The constituent colleges are:

 College of Agriculture - Parbhani
 College of Agriculture - Latur
 College of Agriculture - Dongarshelki Tanda,Udgir (Latur Dist)
 College of Agriculture - Badnapur
 College of Agriculture - Ambajogai
 College of Agriculture - Osmanabad
 College of Agriculture - Golegaon
 College of Horticulture - Parbhani
 College of Food Technology - Parbhani
 College of Agricultural Engineering and Technology - Parbhani
 College of Community Science - Parbhani
 Vilasrao Deshmukh College of Agricultural Biotechnology - Latur
 Postgraduate Institute of Agricultural Business Management - Chakur
this is best for food technology

Notes

External links
 

Agricultural universities and colleges in Maharashtra
Educational institutions established in 1972
Parbhani
Tourist attractions in Parbhani district
Universities in Maharashtra